"Are You Ready for Love" is a song by Elton John from his 1979 EP The Thom Bell Sessions. The phrase may also refer to:
"Are You Ready for Love", a song by Audio Adrenaline from Until My Heart Caves In, 2005
Are You Ready for Love?, a 2006 British film directed by Helen M. Grace